is a former Japanese football player and manager.

Playing career
Okubo was born in Shizuoka Prefecture on April 29, 1974. After graduating from Shizuoka University, he joined J1 League club Yokohama Flügels in 1997. Although he played several matches until 1998 season, the club was disbanded end of 1998 season due to financial strain. In 1999, he moved to Japan Football League club Honda. He played as regular player and the club won the 2nd place 1999, 2000 Japan Football League and the champions 2001 Japan Football League. He retired end of 2001 season.

Coaching career
After retirement, Okubo started coaching career at Honda. he served as coach until 2009. In 2010, he became a manager and managed the club in 2 seasons until 2011.

Club statistics

References

External links

1974 births
Living people
Shizuoka University alumni
Association football people from Shizuoka Prefecture
Japanese footballers
J1 League players
Japan Football League players
Yokohama Flügels players
Honda FC players
Japanese football managers
Association football midfielders